The 2009 National Women's Football Championship was the 5th season of the National Women Football Championship, the top-tier of women's football in Pakistan. The event took place from 29 July to 11 August 2009 in Jinnah Sports Stadium in Islamabad.

Thirteen teams competed in the tournament, with one of them, Malavan Bandar Anzali, being a guest team from Iran.

Malavan BA won the title after beating Sports Science Department (of University of the Punjab) 11–0 in the final. Defending champions Young Rising Stars came third. Mariam Irandost from Malavan BA was declared the Best Player.

References 

National Women Football Championship seasons